Connie Bernardy (born February 26, 1963) is a Minnesota politician and member of the Minnesota House of Representatives. A member of the Minnesota Democratic–Farmer–Labor Party (DFL), she represents District 41A in the north-central Twin Cities metropolitan area.

Education
Bernardy graduated from Spring Lake Park High School. She attended Anoka-Ramsey Community College. She later attended the University of Minnesota, graduating with a B.A. in communication studies, and also the University of St. Thomas, graduating with an M.B.A. certification in government acquisitions and contract management.

Minnesota House of Representatives
Bernardy was first elected to the Minnesota House of Representatives in 2000. She served until she resigned on September 4, 2006 in order to work for Education Minnesota as a government-relations specialist. She was elected to the House again in 2012.

Personal life
Bernardy is married to her husband, Dan. They have three children and reside in New Brighton, Minnesota.

References

External links

Rep. Connie Bernardy official Minnesota House of Representatives website
Rep. Connie Bernardy official campaign website

1963 births
Living people
Women state legislators in Minnesota
Democratic Party members of the Minnesota House of Representatives
People from Fridley, Minnesota
People from New Brighton, Minnesota
University of St. Thomas (Minnesota) alumni
University of Minnesota School of Journalism and Mass Communication alumni
Anoka-Ramsey Community College alumni
21st-century American politicians
21st-century American women politicians